, provisionally known as , is a trans-Neptunian object that resides in the scattered disc region beyond the Kuiper belt. It was discovered on 9 September 2005, by American astronomers Andrew Becker, Andrew Puckett and Jeremy Kubica at Apache Point Observatory in Sunspot, New Mexico. It measures approximately 500–600 kilometers in diameter.

Description 

 is considered likely to be a dwarf planet by both Brown and Tancredi. Based on an absolute magnitude of 4.4, the body's diameter could be anywhere in the range of 350 to 800 kilometres (km), depending on its albedo, the surface reflectivity of the object. Johnston's Archive gives an estimate of 584 km, based on an assumed albedo of 0.09. Brown estimates a diameter of 524 km, based on an absolute magnitude of 4.8 and an assumed albedo of 0.08.

It has been observed 303 times over 17 oppositions, with precovery images dating back to 1976. The orbit is well determined with an uncertainty parameter of 2.

See also

References

External links 
 (145451) 2005 RM43 Precovery Images
 

Scattered disc and detached objects
2005 RM43
2005 RM43
2005 RM43
Possible dwarf planets
Objects observed by stellar occultation
20050909